Supply & Demand is a British television crime drama series, written and devised by Lynda La Plante, first broadcast as a single feature-length pilot on ITV on 5 February 1997. The series follows the work of ESUS (Elite Specialist Undercover Squad), a crack team of detectives tasked with investigating some of the country's biggest criminal importers and smugglers. The pilot was written in 1996, the year that La Plante's most notable television series, Prime Suspect, went on hiatus. Adé Sapara, Eamonn Walker, Benedict Wong, Juliet Aubrey and Ramon Tikaram were credited as principal cast members for the pilot.

ITV subsequently commissioned a full series of six hour-long episodes, which were filmed and broadcast in 1998. These were three two-part stories. Sapara, Walker and Wong returned to the series, alongside new principal cast members Miriam Margolyes, Larry Lamb, Stella Gonet and Martin Kemp. Paul Brodrick and Christine Harmar-Brown co-wrote scripts for the series alongside La Plante. Despite the series achieving a steady viewing audience between 6 and 7 million viewers, La Plante felt that the series had reached a natural end and decided not to write any further episodes, thus meaning the last episode was broadcast on 6 October 1998.

The complete series was released on DVD on 23 July 2007.

Cast
 Adé Sapara as DI Carl Harrington
 Eamonn Walker as DS Jake Brown
 Benedict Wong as DC Frankie Li

Pilot
 Juliet Aubrey as DCI Alex Chomsky
 Ramon Tikaram as DC Irwin
 Fintan McKeown as DCI Smith
 Colin McCormack as Supt. Les Harper 
 Ron Donachie as Supt. Brent

Series
 Miriam Margolyes as Chief Supt. Edna Colley 
 Larry Lamb as Detective Supt. Simon Hughes 
 Stella Gonet as DCI Jane Leyland 
 Martin Kemp as DI Eddie McEwan 
 Terry O'Neill as DS Peter Harper
 Christopher Simon as DC Mikey Da Souza

Episodes

Pilot (1997)

Series (1998)

References

External links

1997 British television series debuts
1998 British television series endings
1990s British drama television series
1990s British crime television series
ITV television dramas
Television series produced at Pinewood Studios
Television series by ITV Studios
Television series by Yorkshire Television
English-language television shows